Paul Anthony Bentley (born 1946) is a male retired sports shooter who competed for Great Britain and England.

Shooting career
Bentley represented Great Britain in the 1984 Summer Olympics. He represented England and won a silver medal in the skeet, at the 1978 Commonwealth Games in Edmonton, Alberta, Canada.

References

1946 births
British male sport shooters
Shooters at the 1978 Commonwealth Games
Olympic shooters of Great Britain
Shooters at the 1984 Summer Olympics
Living people
Commonwealth Games medallists in shooting
Commonwealth Games silver medallists for England
Medallists at the 1978 Commonwealth Games